Coquitlam-Moody was a provincial electoral district in the Canadian province of British Columbia from 1979 to 1986.  Its predecessor riding was Coquitlam and its successor was the Coquitlam-Maillardville riding.

For other Greater Vancouver area ridings please see New Westminster (electoral districts) and/or Vancouver (electoral districts).

Electoral history 
Note:  Winners in each election are in bold.

|Progressive Conservative
|Orest Peter Jakubec
|align="right"|762
|align="right"|3.69%
|align="right"|
|align="right"|unknown

|North American Labour Party
|Calvin Alphonso Segur
|align="right"|33
|align="right"|0.16%
|align="right"|
|align="right"|unknown
|- bgcolor="white"
!align="right" colspan=3|Total valid votes
!align="right"|20,629
!align="right"|100.00%
!align="right"|
|- bgcolor="white"
!align="right" colspan=3|Total rejected ballots
!align="right"|223
!align="right"|
!align="right"|
|- bgcolor="white"
!align="right" colspan=3|Turnout
!align="right"|%
!align="right"|
!align="right"|
|}

|New Democrat
|Mark Rose
|align="right"|14,717
|align="right"|51.81%
|align="right"|
|align="right"|unknown

|- bgcolor="white"
!align="right" colspan=3|Total valid votes
!align="right"|28,407
!align="right"|100.00%
!align="right"|
|- bgcolor="white"
!align="right" colspan=3|Total rejected ballots
!align="right"|267
!align="right"|
!align="right"|
|- bgcolor="white"
!align="right" colspan=3|Turnout
!align="right"|%
!align="right"|
!align="right"|
|}

|- bgcolor="white"
!align="right" colspan=3|Total valid votes
!align="right"|30,618
!align="right"|100.00%
!align="right"|
|- bgcolor="white"
!align="right" colspan=3|Total rejected ballots
!align="right"|364
!align="right"|
!align="right"|
|- bgcolor="white"
!align="right" colspan=3|Turnout
!align="right"|%
!align="right"|
!align="right"|
|}

Sources 

Elections BC Historical Returns

Former provincial electoral districts of British Columbia
Politics of Coquitlam
Port Moody